The Alameda Free Library is the city library of Alameda, California. The Carnegie library was built from 1902 to 1903 and was the first designated building for the city's library, which had been housed in various other buildings since 1877.

Architectural style
C. H. Foster and his son G. J. Foster designed the building in an eclectic blend of multiple architectural styles, including Neoclassical, Renaissance Revival, and Baroque Revival. The two-story building is faced with pressed and molded buff brick outside of its basement, which was built in gray sandstone. The library's front has a portico with two brick columns and a frieze with a decorative tympanum displaying an open book; the columns were the first of their kind in California. The building's entrance is located within the portico atop sets of marble and granite stairs. A pair of windows appears to each side of the entrance; the top window in each pair is arched, while the bottom one is rectangular and flanked by columns. The metal hipped roof of the library has a raised glass skylight. The library's main room is on the second story, which can be reached by a marble staircase; the main room contains five stained glass windows on its south wall.

The library was added to the National Register of Historic Places on June 25, 1982.

References

Libraries on the National Register of Historic Places in California
Libraries in Alameda County, California
Library buildings completed in 1902
Buildings and structures in Alameda, California
Carnegie libraries in California
National Register of Historic Places in Alameda County, California